Carlton Chester Qualey (December 17, 1904 – March 25, 1988) was an American academic, author, and historian. His research specialized principally in Norwegian-American immigration. An eminent historian, his publications include books, articles and reviews produced over a 60-year career. He is most frequently associated with his 1938 study, Norwegian Settlement in the United States.

Early life and education
Qualey was born in Spring Grove, Minnesota, the son of Ole O. Qualey (1858–1937) and Clara Amalia (Knatterud) Qualey (1868–1947), He earned a bachelor's degree from St. Olaf College in 1929, a master's from the University of Minnesota in 1930, and a PhD from Columbia University in 1938.

Career 
Qualey taught history at Columbia University from 1936 to 1944, Swarthmore College from 1944 to 1945, Columbia Graduate School from 1945 to 1946, and Carleton College from 1946 to 1970.

Qualey was a member of the Mississippi Valley Historical Association from 1940 to 1965 and the Organization of American Historians from 1965 to 1973. He served on the editorial board of the Norwegian-American Historical Association from 1931 to 1987. Qualey was the superintendent of the Minnesota Historical Society from 1947 to 1948, as well as a research fellow and initiator of the Ethnic History Project from 1973 to 1981. He was one of the founders and treasurer of the Immigration and Ethnic History Society and for many years editor of the Immigration and Ethnic History Newsletter.

Personal life 
Qualey and his wife, Elizabeth, had two children. Elizabeth was the sister of E. E. Cummings. Qualey died in Minneapolis in 1988.

Awards
The Carlton C. Qualey Memorial Article Award is a prize is awarded every other year for the best article appearing in the Journal of American Ethnic History during the two preceding calendar years. The award was established by the Immigration and Ethnic History Society in memory of Professor Carlton C. Qualey who was a founder of the Society. The Journal of American Ethnic History is published by the University of Illinois Press. Champaign, Illinois.

Selected bibliography
Pioneer Norwegian Settlement in Minnesota to 1876 (University of Minnesota. 1930)
The Fox River Norwegian Settlement: On occasion of the Celebration of 100th Anniversary of the first permanent Norwegian Settlement in the United States at Norway & Ottawa, Illinois, June 22–24, 1934 (Illinois State Historical Society. 1934)
The Settlement and Agriculture Development of the Township of Spring Grove, Houston County, Minnesota to 1880 (Norwegian-American Historical Association. 1936)
Norwegian Settlement in the United States (Norwegian American Historical Association. 1938)
Recent Biographies in American History (National Council for the Social Studies. 1951)
Thorstein Veblen (University Presses of California, Columbia and Princeton. 1968)
On Being an Ethnic Historian (Friends of the Library, Western Reserve Historical Society. 1972)
American Ethnic Nationalisms: A Bibliographical Selection (University of Prince Edward Island. 1979)

References

Further reading
Cross, Robert D. "A Tribute to Carlton C. Qualey" (The Journal of American Ethnic History, Fall 1988 Vol. 8 No. 1)

External links
  Carlton C. Qualey papers (Minnesota Historic Society)
"Journal of American Ethnic History"

1904 births
1988 deaths
American people of Norwegian descent
People from Spring Grove, Minnesota
University of Minnesota alumni
St. Olaf College alumni
Columbia University alumni
Columbia University faculty
Swarthmore College faculty
Carleton College faculty
20th-century American historians
20th-century American male writers
American male non-fiction writers